The 77th Oregon Legislative Assembly convened beginning on , for the first of its two regular sessions, and on  for its second session.

The Democratic Party of Oregon retained its 16–14 majority in the Senate, and took a 34–26 majority in the House, which in the previous session had been split evenly with the Oregon Republican Party.

Senate 
Based on the results of the 2012 elections, the Oregon State Senate is composed of 16 Democrats and 14 Republicans,  the same composition as in the previous session.

Senate members 

The Oregon State Senate is composed of 16 Democrats and 14 Republicans, the same composition as the previous session.

Senate President: Peter Courtney (D–11 Salem)
President Pro Tem: Ginny Burdick (D–18 Portland)
Majority Leader: Diane Rosenbaum (D–21 Portland)
Minority Leader: Ted Ferrioli (R–30 John Day)

House members 

Based on the results of the 2012 elections, the Oregon House of Representatives is composed of 34 Democrats and 26 Republicans. Prior to the elections, the House was evenly split between 30 Democrats and 30 Republicans.

Speaker: Tina Kotek (D–44 Portland)
Majority Leader: Val Hoyle (D–14 Eugene)
Minority Leader: Mike McLane (R–55 Powell Butte)

See also 
 Oregon legislative elections, 2012

References

External links 
 Chronology of regular legislative sessions from Oregon Blue Book
 Chronology of special legislative sessions from Blue Book

Oregon legislative sessions
2013 in Oregon
2014 in Oregon
2013 U.S. legislative sessions
2014 U.S. legislative sessions